Brilliance of the Seas is a cruise ship belonging to the Royal Caribbean's . Brilliance of the Seas is operated by RCL UK Ltd., a subsidiary of Royal Caribbean Cruises Ltd. Brilliance of the Seas has a maximum capacity of 2,543 passengers and carries 848 crew.

Areas of operation 

Brilliance of the Seas undertakes Western Caribbean cruises out of Tampa, Florida during the winter season and cruises in European waters during the summer and fall season. Now it also offers cruises to the Bahamas and to the Caribbean.

Incidents

Heeling incident 
On December 11, 2010, Brilliance of the Seas left Rhodes, Greece on a 6-port cruise to Alexandria, Egypt, and other stops around the eastern Mediterranean and experienced very high seas and  wind gusts. At around 2:15 AM, it was reported that in a cluster of ships rushing to enter the port of Alexandria, a freighter turned in front of the Brilliance of the Seas, forcing the ship's captain, Erik Tengelsen, to slow below the  necessary to maintain her stabilisers' function. Brilliance of the Seas started to heel port and starboard violently. Passengers reported that they were thrown out of beds; furniture and unsecured objects tossed and slid about their staterooms. Two grand pianos broke free and were demolished during the incident. Windows and mirrors were smashed, and the spa basins were damaged. A reported 138 passengers needed medical treatment for their injuries, the most serious of which were two guests that sustained broken bones. The heeling incident lasted several minutes, after which the captain acknowledged that it had been a "horrifying experience." It is for that reason that many passengers felt the Captain and Royal Caribbean were partly responsible for the horrifying heeling incident that passengers were subjected to, since they knew well in advance what the potential for trouble was. The next morning, Royal Caribbean International announced through its crew that a $200 per-stateroom refund would be given. Following a brief, but vocal outrage by passengers, Royal announced that on top of the $200, passengers could also expect a full refund of each passenger's stateroom fare. A lawsuit brought by the husband of Barbara Davey, a Scottish woman who fell into a coma three days afterwards and later died, claimed that her death had been caused by head injuries sustained during the incident.

Disappearance of George Allen Smith 

George Allen Smith disappeared on July 5, 2005 when the Brilliance of the Seas was between Greece and Turkey. He was a passenger on his honeymoon. Blood was found inside and outside his room. His family accuses Royal Caribbean of failing to adequately handle the case. The case led to an FBI investigation and a congressional inquiry in the United States.

References

External links 

 
 Transcript of an interview with family of George Smith on Larry King Live
 Brilliance of the Seas Cutaway

Ships of Royal Caribbean International
Ships built in Papenburg
Panamax cruise ships
2001 ships